Markus Hofmeier (born 7 October 1993) is a German footballer who plays as a right winger for SF Friedrichsdorf.

References

External links

1993 births
Living people
Footballers from Frankfurt
German footballers
Association football midfielders
SV Darmstadt 98 players
2. Bundesliga players
FSV Frankfurt players
Wormatia Worms players